Nazim Uddin Mostan (September 11, 1948 – August 18, 2013) was a Bangladeshi journalist. He was a former chief reporter of The Daily Ittefaq until 1998. He was awarded Ekushey Padak in 2003 by the Government of Bangladesh for his contribution to journalism.

Education and career
Mostan completed his bachelor's from University of Dhaka in 1979. He started his journalism career in the late 1960s. He worked at The Sangbad and Daily Paygam.

Awards
 Ekushey Padak (2003)
 Bangladesh Computer Samity Award (2003)

References

1948 births
2013 deaths
People from Chandpur District
Bangladeshi journalists
University of Dhaka alumni
Recipients of the Ekushey Padak